Denise Carrier-Perreault (born June 21, 1946) is a Quebec politician. She represented Chutes-de-la-Chaudière in the National Assembly of Quebec from 1989 to 2003, as a member of the Parti Québécois.

Carrier-Perreault earned a diploma in graphic design from Cégep de Sainte-Foy and a bachelor's degree in industrial relations from Université Laval in 1984. She worked at Bell Canada, as a telephonist from 1963 to 1968, as a union designer from 1968 to 1971 and then as a regional president of the union from 1971 to 1973. From 1984 to 1985 she served as a commissioner with the Chutes-de-la-Chaudière School Board. From 1985 to 1989, she was a Human Resources Management Consultant, just prior to her election, she was a trainer in occupational health and safety.

She ran for the Parti Québécois in the newly created constituency of Chutes-de-la-Chaudière in the 1989 Quebec general election and won. She was re-elected in the 1994 and  1998 Quebec general elections.

Carrier-Perrault served in the government of Lucien Bouchard as Minister for Lands, Mines and Forests.

She did not seek re-election in 2003.

Cabinet positions

References 

1946 births
Living people
Women government ministers of Canada
French Quebecers
Members of the Executive Council of Quebec
Parti Québécois MNAs
Quebec school board members
Université Laval alumni
Women MNAs in Quebec
20th-century Canadian legislators
20th-century Canadian women politicians
21st-century Canadian legislators
21st-century Canadian women politicians